Deep Creek Reservoir is a man-made lake in Elko County, Nevada in the United States.

See also
List of dams in the Columbia River watershed

References 

Dams in Nevada
Reservoirs in Nevada
Buildings and structures in Elko County, Nevada
Lakes of Elko County, Nevada